These are the official results of the Men's Decathlon competition at the 1995 World Championships in Gothenburg, Sweden. There were a total number of 30 participating athletes, including nine non-finishers. The competition started on August 6, 1995, and ended a day later, on August 7, 1995.

Medalists

Schedule

Sunday, August 6

Monday, August 7

Abbreviations

Records

Results

See also
 1994 Men's European Championships Decathlon
 1995 Hypo-Meeting
 1995 Décastar
 1995 Decathlon Year Ranking
 1996 Men's Olympic Decathlon

References
 Results

D
Decathlon at the World Athletics Championships